Poggio Moiano is a  (municipality) in the Province of Rieti in the Italian region of Latium, located about  northeast of Rome and about  south of Rieti.

Poggio Moiano borders the following municipalities: Colle di Tora, Frasso Sabino, Monteleone Sabino, Poggio Nativo, Pozzaglia Sabina, Rocca Sinibalda, Scandriglia, Torricella in Sabina.

References

External links
 Official website

Cities and towns in Lazio